An electric water boiler, also called a thermo pot, is a consumer electronics small appliance used for boiling water and maintaining it at a constant temperature in an enclosed reservoir.  It is typically used to provide an immediate source of hot water for making tea, hot chocolate, coffee, instant noodles, or baby formula, or for any other household use where clean hot water is required. They are a common component of Japanese kitchens and the kitchens of many East Asian countries but are found in varying use globally. Smaller units are portable. Some thermo pots are designed with a feature that can purify water.

Components
An electric water boiler consists of a water reservoir with a heating element at the bottom. Some models offer multiple temperature settings. Other models are part of larger water systems that boil water and provide hot, cold, and lukewarm water. Water may be dispensed in various ways, e.g. by pouring, an electric pump or by pressing a large button that functions as a diaphragm pump.

Sedimentation
Sedimentation is the accumulation within the water reservoir of natural minerals that exist in trace amounts in municipal water mains, mainly calcium carbonate. Heating the water causes the minerals to separate and fall to the bottom of the reservoir. This buildup can eventually create a variety of noises in gas boilers, reduce the efficiency of the unit and give rise to a sulfur (or rotten-egg) smell. Vinegar or citric acid can be used to descale electric kettles.

Uses 
Some electric water boiler models enable tea to be steeped at a desired, adjustable temperature.

See also
 Samovar
 Electric kettle
 Electric steam boiler
 Instant hot water dispenser
 Thermoelectricity
 Joule heating

References

Further reading
 Materials and the Environment: Eco-informed Material Choice - M. F. Ashby. pp. 198–199. Retrieved on 2014-03-25.

External links

Home appliances
Boilers (cookware)